is Thelma Aoyama's seventh single, and her second in 2009. It was released on  August 5, 2009. The title is the theme song for Hachi: A Dog's Tale, which was released in Japan on August 8. The B-side, "Don't Stop", features vocals by AI. The CD+DVD edition of the single includes the music video for "Wasurenai yo".

Track listing

Live performances 
 08/03 - Wasurenai yo - Hey! Hey! Hey!
 08/07 - Wasurenai yo - Music Station

Charting and release 
On its first day on the Oricon charts the single debuted at #20, it has since peaked at #14. The single eventually debuted at #20 on the Oricon weekly chart, selling 4,722 physical copies that week. In its second week the single dropped three places to #23 and sold a further 3,117 copies, and sold 1,642 in its third week, bringing the total sales to 9,481 copies sold.

Oricon Charts 

Total sales: 9,481*

Billboard Japan Charts

External links 
 Oricon Profile

2009 singles
Thelma Aoyama songs
2009 songs
Universal J singles